The domestic or domesticated rabbit—more commonly known as a pet rabbit, bunny, bun, or bunny rabbit—is the domesticated form of the European rabbit, a member of the lagomorph family. A male rabbit is known as a buck, a female is a doe, and a young rabbit is a kit, or kitten.

Rabbits were first used for their food and fur by the Romans, and have been kept as pets in Western nations since the 19th century. Rabbits can be housed in exercise pens, but free roaming without any boundaries in a rabbit-proofed space has become popularized on social media in recent years. Beginning in the 1980s, the idea of the domestic rabbit as a house companion, a so-called house rabbit similar to a house cat, was promoted. Rabbits can be litter box-trained and taught to come when called, but they require exercise and can damage a house that has not been "rabbit proofed" based on their innate need to chew. Accidental interactions between pet rabbits and wild rabbits, while seemingly harmless, are usually strongly discouraged due to the species' different temperaments as well as wild rabbits potentially carrying diseases.

Unwanted pet rabbits end up in animal shelters, especially after the Easter season (see Easter Bunny). In 2017, they were the United States' third most abandoned pet. Some of them go on to be adopted and become family pets in various forms. Because their wild counterparts have become invasive in Australia, pet rabbits are banned in the state of Queensland. Pet rabbits, being a domesticated breed that lack survival instincts, do not fare well in the wild if they are abandoned or escape from captivity.

History 
Phoenician sailors visiting the coast of Spain c. 12th century BC, mistaking the European rabbit for a species from their homeland (the rock hyrax Procavia capensis), gave it the name i-shepan-ham (land or island of hyraxes).

The captivity of rabbits as a food source is recorded as early as the 1st century BC, when the Roman writer Pliny the Elder described the use of rabbit hutches, along with enclosures called . A controversial theory is that a corruption of the rabbit's name used by the Romans became the Latin name for the peninsula, Hispania. In Rome, rabbits were raised in large walled colonies with walls extended underground. According to Pliny, the consumption of unborn and newborn rabbits, called laurices, was considered a delicacy.

Evidence for the domestic rabbit is rather late. In the Middle Ages, wild rabbits were often kept for the hunt. Monks in southern France were crossbreeding rabbits at least by the 12th century AD. Domestication was probably a slow process that took place from the Roman period (or earlier) until the 1500s.In the 19th century, as animal fancy in general began to emerge, rabbit fanciers began to sponsor rabbit exhibitions and fairs in Western Europe and the United States. Breeds of various domesticated animals were created and modified for the added purpose of exhibition, a departure from the breeds that had been created solely for food, fur, or wool. The rabbit's emergence as a household pet began during the Victorian era.
The keeping of the rabbit as a pet commencing from the 1800s coincides with the first observable skeletal differences between the wild and domestic populations, even though captive rabbits had been exploited for over 2,000 years. Domestic rabbits have been popular in the United States since the late 19th century. What became known as the "Belgian Hare Boom" began with the importation of the first Belgian Hares from England in 1888 and, soon after, the founding of the American Belgian Hare Association, the first rabbit club in America. From 1898 to 1901, many thousands of Belgian Hares were imported to America. Today, the Belgian Hare is one of the rarest breeds, with only 132 specimens found in the United States in a 2015 census.

The American Rabbit Breeders Association (ARBA) was founded in 1910 and is the national authority on rabbit raising and rabbit breeds having a uniform Standard of Perfection, registration and judging system. The domestic rabbit continues to be popular as a show animal and pet.  Many thousand rabbit shows occur each year and are sanctioned in Canada and the United States by the ARBA. Today, the domesticated rabbit is the third most popular mammalian pet in Britain after dogs and cats.

Experimentation 
Rabbits have been, and continue to be, used in laboratory work such as the production of antibodies for vaccines and research of human male reproductive system toxicology. The Environmental Health Perspective, published by the National Institute of Health, states, "The rabbit [is] an extremely valuable model for studying the effects of chemicals or other stimuli on the male reproductive system." According to the Humane Society of the United States, rabbits are also used extensively in the study of bronchial asthma, stroke prevention treatments, cystic fibrosis, diabetes, and cancer. Animal rights activists have opposed animal experimentation for non-medical purposes, such as the testing of cosmetic and cleaning products, which has resulted in decreased use of rabbits in these areas.

Terminology 
Male rabbits are called bucks; females are called does.  An older term for an adult rabbit is coney, while rabbit once referred only to the young animals.  Another term for a young rabbit is bunny, though this term is often applied informally (especially by children and rabbit enthusiasts) to rabbits generally, especially domestic ones. More recently, the term kit or kitten has been used to refer to a young rabbit. A young hare is called a leveret; this term is sometimes informally applied to a young rabbit as well.  A group of rabbits is known as a "colony" or a "nest". House rabbit enthusiasts may call their group of house rabbits a "fluffle".

Biology

Genetics

The study of rabbit genetics is of interest to fanciers, the fiber and fur industry, medical researchers, and the meat industry. Among rabbit fanciers, the genetics of rabbit health and diversity are paramount. The fiber & fur industry focuses on the genetics of coat color and hair properties. In the biomedical research community and the pharmaceutical industry, rabbit genetics are important in model organism research, antibody production, and toxicity testing. The meat industry relies on genetics for disease resistance, feed conversion ratios, and reproduction potential in rabbits.

The rabbit genome has been sequenced and is publicly available. The mitochondrial DNA has also been sequenced. In 2011, parts of the rabbit genome were re-sequenced in greater depth in order to expose variation within the genome.

There are 11 color gene groups (or loci) in rabbits. A rabbit's coat has either two pigments (pheomelanin for yellow, and eumelanin for dark brown) or no pigment (for an albino rabbit).  Clusters of color genes plus their modifiers control such aspects as coat patterns (e.g. Dutch or English markings), color hues and their intensity or dilution, and the location of color bands on the hair shaft (e.g., silvering).

Diet

As a refinement of the diet of the wild rabbit, the diet of the domestic rabbit is often a function of its purpose. Show rabbits are fed for vibrant health, strong musculoskeletal systems, and—like rabbits intended for the fur trade—optimal coat production and condition. Rabbits intended for the meat trade are fed for swift and efficient production of flesh, while rabbits in research settings have closely controlled diets for specific goals. Nutritional needs of the domestic rabbit may also be focused on developing a physique that allows for the safe delivery of larger litters of healthy kits. Optimizing costs and producing feces that meet local waste regulations may also be factors. The diet of a pet rabbit, too, is geared toward its purpose—as a healthy and long-lived companion.

Hay is an essential part of the diet of all rabbits and it is a major component of the commercial food pellets that are formulated for domestic rabbits and available in many areas. Pellets are typically fed to adult rabbits in limited quantities once or twice a day, to mimic their natural behavior and to prevent obesity. It is recommended only a teaspoon to an egg cup full of pellets is fed to adult rabbits each day. Most rabbit pellets are alfalfa-based for protein and fiber, with other grains completing the carbohydrate requirements. "Muesli" style rabbit foods are also available; these contain separate components—e.g., dried carrot, pea flakes and hay pellets as opposed to a uniform pellet. These are not recommended as rabbits will choose favored parts and leave the rest. Muesli style feeds are often lower in fiber than pelleted versions of rabbit food. Additionally numerous studies have found they increase the risk of obesity and dental disease.  Minerals and vitamins are added during production of rabbit pellets to meet the nutritional requirements of the domestic rabbit. Along with pellets, many commercial rabbit raisers also feed one or more types of loose hay, for its freshness and important cellulose components. Alfalfa in particular is recommended for the growth needs of young rabbits. Alfalfa hay is not recommended for adult rabbits, as it is too rich in protein and too high in calcium. Grass hays are best because they are lower in protein and calcium; common sources of hay for rabbits include bluegrass, brome, fescue, marsh, orchard, timothy, oat and ryegrass. Offering a diversity of hay is important nutritionally. A diversity of hay also desensitizes rabbits to small changes in smell and texture, resulting in good, consistent eaters.

Digestion
Rabbits are hindgut fermenters and therefore have an enlarged cecum. This allows a rabbit to digest, via fermentation, what it otherwise would not be able to metabolically process.

After a rabbit ingests food, the food travels down the esophagus and through a small valve called the cardia.  In rabbits, this valve is very well pronounced and makes the rabbit incapable of vomiting. The food enters the stomach after passing through the cardia. Food then moves to the stomach and small intestine, where a majority of nutrient extraction and absorption takes place. Food then passes into the colon and eventually into the cecum. Peristaltic muscle contractions (waves of motion) help to separate fibrous and non-fibrous particles.  The non-fibrous particles are then moved backwards up the colon, through the illeo-cecal valve, and into the cecum. Symbiotic bacteria in the cecum help to further digest the non-fibrous particles into a more metabolically manageable substance.  After as little as three hours, a soft, fecal "pellet," called a cecotrope, is expelled from the rabbit's anus.  The rabbit instinctively eats these grape-like pellets, without chewing, in exchange keeping the mucous coating intact. This coating protects the vitamin- and nutrient-rich bacteria from stomach acid, until it reaches the small intestine, where the nutrients from the cecotrope can be absorbed.

The soft pellets contain a sufficiently large portion of nutrients that are critical to the rabbit's health.  This soft fecal matter is rich in vitamin B and other nutrients.  The process of coprophagy is important to the stability of a rabbit's digestive health because it is one important way that which a rabbit receives vitamin B in a form that is useful to its digestive wellness. Occasionally, the rabbit may leave these pellets lying about its cage; this behavior is harmless and usually related to an ample food supply.

When caecal pellets are wet and runny (semi-liquid) and stick to the rabbit and surrounding objects, they are called intermittent soft cecotropes (ISCs). This is different from ordinary diarrhea and is usually caused by a diet too high in carbohydrates or too low in fiber. Soft fruit or salad items such as lettuce, cucumbers and tomatoes are possible causes.

Reproduction

Rabbits are prolific breeders, in part because rabbits reach breeding age quickly. To prevent unwanted offspring and to possibly benefit the rabbit's behavior, rabbits may be spayed or neutered at sexual maturity: 4–5 months for small breeds (e.g., Mini Rex, Netherland Dwarf), 5–6 months for medium-sized breeds (e.g., Rex, New Zealand), and 6–7 months for large breeds (e.g., Flemish Giant). Bucks usually require more time to sexually mature than does, and they normally reach adult sperm counts at 6–7 months.

Like all mammals, rabbits produce milk for their young.  Female rabbits have six to eight nipples and produce milk for four weeks after birthing. Rabbit milk is relatively high in fat, as a percentage by mass. While most species produce approximately 5% milk fat, rabbits produce 12%. The excerpted table below compares milk characteristics among mammals.

Health

Disease is rare when rabbits are raised in sanitary conditions and provided with adequate care.  Rabbits have fragile bones, especially in their spines, and need support on the belly or bottom when they are picked up.

Rabbits will gnaw on almost anything, including electrical cords (possibly leading to electrocution), potentially poisonous plants, and material like carpet and fabric that may cause life-threatening intestinal blockages, so areas to which they have access need to be pet-proofed.

Spaying and neutering
Neutering is possible for both female and male rabbits, however, spaying females can pose significant risks. This is because spaying female rabbits requires a far bigger surgery with a higher mortality rate (during or in relation to the procedure) compared to males, as their lower abdomen needs to be opened up in order to remove ovaries and uterus. In addition, spaying is known to have severe negative effects on a female rabbit's health. One particularly dangerous consequence is the development of osteoporosis due to the lack of estrogen caused by the removal of the ovaries, which, among other things, greatly increases the risk of dental problems and bone fractures. Other negative health outcomes that have been reported include colonic obstruction, urinary incontinence, ureteral stenosis, increased ageing of ligaments, and alterations of the rabbit’s cornea. In general, due to the wide range and severity of possible negative health effects and the high risk for complications from anesthesia and the surgery itself, spaying female rabbits should only be considered in case of acute medical reasons (e. g. ovarian or uterine cancer), if they show signs of hormonal problems, like overly frequent phases of heat or pseudopregnancies, or unusually aggressive behavior, which cannot be attributed to environmental factors, e. g. a lack of exercise. As of today, assertions of female rabbits near inevitably developing cancer if left unneutered as well as neutered females living longer, have no scientific foundation.  

However, castration of male pet rabbits is necessary, if they are to be kept species-appropriate (together with at least one other rabbit), which wouldn't otherwise be possible. Uncastrated male rabbits will engage in severe and often bloody fights with each other upon reaching adulthood, which can even end fatally. To prevent uncontrolled reproduction, it is advised to castrate males instead of females, as the necessary procedure, which requires only a small incision, has proven to be relatively safe and to have far less adverse effects on the rabbit's overall health.

Vaccinations
In most jurisdictions, including the United States (except where required by local animal control ordinances), rabbits do not require vaccination. Vaccinations exist for both rabbit hemorrhagic disease and myxomatosis. These vaccinations are usually given annually, two weeks apart. If there is an outbreak of myxomatosis locally, this vaccine can be administered every six months for extra protection.  Myxomatosis immunizations are not available in all countries, including Australia, due to fears that immunity will pass on to feral rabbits. However, they are recommended by some veterinarians as prophylactics, where they are legally available.

Declawing
A rabbit cannot be declawed. Lacking pads on the bottoms of its feet, a rabbit requires its claws for traction. Removing its claws would render it unable to stand.

Tonic immobility
Coping with stress is a key aspect of rabbit behavior, and this can be traced to part of the brain known as ventral tegmental area (VTA).  Dopaminergic neurons in this part of the brain release the hormone dopamine. In rabbits, it is released as part of a coping mechanism while in a heightened state of fear or stress, and has a calming effect. Dopamine has also been found in the rabbit's medial prefrontal cortex, the nucleus accumbens, and the amygdala. Physiological and behavioral responses to human-induced tonic immobility (TI, sometimes termed "trancing" or "playing dead") have been found to be indicative of a fear-motivated stress state, confirming that the promotion of TI to try to increase a bond between rabbits and their owners—thinking the rabbits enjoy it—is misplaced. However, some researchers conclude that inducing TI in rabbits is appropriate for certain medical procedures, as it holds less risk than anesthesia.

Sore hocks
The formation of open sores on the rabbit's hocks, commonly called sore hocks, is a problem that commonly afflicts mostly heavy-weight rabbits kept in cages with wire flooring or soiled solid flooring.  The problem is most prevalent in rex-furred rabbits and heavy-weight rabbits (over ), as well as those with thin foot bristles.

The condition results when, over the course of time, the protective bristle-like fur on the rabbit's hocks thins down. Standing urine or other unsanitary cage conditions can exacerbate the problem by irritating the sensitive skin. The exposed skin in turn can result in tender areas or, in severe cases, open sores, which may then become infected and abscessed if not properly cared for.

Gastrointestinal stasis

Gastrointestinal stasis (GI stasis) is a serious and potentially fatal condition that occurs in some rabbits in which gut motility is severely reduced and possibly completely stopped. When untreated or improperly treated, GI stasis can be fatal in as little as 24 hours.

GI stasis is the condition of food not moving through the gut as quickly as normal. The gut contents may dehydrate and compact into a hard, immobile mass (impacted gut), blocking the digestive tract of the rabbit. Food in an immobile gut may also ferment, causing significant gas buildup and resultant gas pain for the rabbit.

The first noticeable symptom of GI stasis may be that the rabbit suddenly stops eating. Treatment frequently includes intravenous or subcutaneous fluid therapy (rehydration through injection of a balanced electrolyte solution), pain control, possible careful massage to promote gas expulsion and comfort, drugs to promote gut motility, and careful monitoring of all inputs and outputs. The rabbit's diet may also be changed as part of treatment, to include force-feeding to ensure adequate nutrition.  Surgery to remove the blockage is not generally recommended and comes with a poor prognosis.

Some rabbits are more prone to GI stasis than others. The causes of GI stasis are not completely understood, but common contributing factors are thought to include stress, reduced food intake, low fiber in the diet, dehydration, reduction in exercise or blockage caused by excess fur or carpet ingestion.  Stress factors can include changes in housing, transportation, or medical procedures under anesthesia. As many of these factors may occur together (poor dental structure leading to decreased food intake, followed by a stressful veterinary dental procedure to correct the dental problem) establishing a root cause may be difficult.

GI stasis is sometimes misdiagnosed as "hair balls" by veterinarians or rabbit keepers not familiar with the condition. While fur is commonly found in the stomach following a fatal case of GI stasis, it is also found in healthy rabbits.  Molting and chewing fur can be a predisposing factor in the occurrence of GI stasis, however, the primary cause is the change in motility of the gut.

Dental problems
Dental disease has several causes, namely genetics, inappropriate diet, injury to the jaw, infection, or cancer.

 Malocclusion: Rabbit teeth are open-rooted and continue to grow throughout their lives, which is why they need constant abrasion. Since tooth enamel is the hardest substance in the body and much harder than anything a rabbit could chew, wearing down the teeth can only happen through chewing movements, i. e. by the teeth wearing down each other. If the teeth are not properly aligned, a condition called malocclusion, the necessary abrasion cannot happen naturally and needs to be done manually by an experienced veterinarian.  Malocclusion can be either inborn or have a secondary cause. Inborn malocclusion usually presents as brachygnathism or prognathism and will generally show within the first few months of a rabbit's life. Any dental problems that start appearing in adult rabbits, however, cannot be inborn. The most common secondary causes of malocclusion are trauma (e. g. falls on the nose, nibbling on cage grids, clipping the teeth with unsuited tools), bacterial infection, and low-fiber diet.
 Molar spurs: These are caused by improper abrasion of the molars and can dig into the rabbit's tongue and/or cheek causing severe pain. They can develop into a secondary malocclusion and need to be filed down by an experienced veterinarian. If left untreated, molar spurs can be fatal. The underlying cause of molar spurs in rabbits without (inborn) malocclusion is usually a wrong diet. Since, as mentioned above, teeth cannot wear down on food, rabbits need high-fiber and other chewing intensive food, particularly hay, grass, potherbs, and herbs, to keep their teeth in shape. Most industrially produced ready-made rabbit foods, however, especially pellets and muesli, are very low-fiber and therefore are known to be one of the main causes of molar spurs and secondary malocclusion if fed over an extended period of time. 
 Osteoporosis: Rabbits, especially neutered females and those that are kept indoors without adequate natural sunlight, can suffer from osteoporosis, in which holes appear in the skull by X-Ray imaging. This reflects the general thinning of the bone, and teeth will start to become looser in the sockets, making it uncomfortable and painful for the animal to chew hay. The inability to properly chew hay can result in molar spurs, as described above, and weight loss, leading into a downward spiral if not treated promptly. This can be reversible and treatable. A veterinary formulated liquid calcium supplement with vitamin D3 and magnesium can be given mixed with the rabbit's drinking water, once or twice per week, according to the veterinarian's instructions. The molar spurs should also be trimmed down by an experienced exotic veterinarian specialised in rabbit care, once per 1–2 months depending on the case.

Signs of dental difficulty include difficulty eating, weight loss and small stools and visibly overgrown teeth. However, there are many other causes of ptyalism, including pain due to other causes.

Respiratory and conjunctival problems
An over-diagnosed ailment amongst rabbits is respiratory infection, known colloquially as "snuffles". Pasteurella, a bacterium, is usually misdiagnosed and this is known to be a factor in the overuse of antibiotics among rabbits. A runny nose, for instance, can have several causes, among those being high temperature or humidity, extreme stress, environmental pollution (like perfume or incense), or a sinus infection. Options for treating this is removing the pollutant, lowering or raising the temperature accordingly, and medical treatment for sinus infections. Pasteurella does live naturally in a rabbit's respiratory tract, and it can flourish out of control in some cases. In the rare event that happens, antibiotic treatment is necessary.

Sneezing can be a sign of environmental pollution (such as too much dust) or a food allergy.

Runny eyes and other conjunctival problems can be caused by dental disease or a blockage of the tear duct. Environmental pollution, corneal disease, entropion, distichiasis, or inflammation of the eyes are also causes. This is easy to diagnose as well as treat.

Viral diseases
Rabbits are subject to infection by a variety of viruses. Some have had deadly and widespread impact.

Myxomatosis

Myxomatosis is a virulent threat to all rabbits but not to humans. The intentional introduction of myxomatosis in rabbit-ravaged Australia killed an estimated 500 million feral rabbits between 1950 and 1952. The Australian government will not allow veterinarians to purchase and use the myxomatosis vaccine that would protect domestic rabbits, for fear that this immunity would be spread into the wild via escaped livestock and pets. This potential consequence is also one motivation for the pet-rabbit ban in Queensland.

In Australia, rabbits caged outdoors in areas with high numbers of mosquitoes are vulnerable to myxomatosis. In Europe, fleas are the carriers of myxomatosis. In some countries, annual vaccinations against myxomatosis are available.

Rabbit hemorrhagic disease (RHD)

Rabbit hemorrhagic disease (RHD), also known as viral hemorrhagic disease (VHD) or rabbit calicivirus disease (RCD), is caused by a rabbit-specific calicivirus known as RHDV or RCV. Discovered in 1983, RHD is highly infectious and usually fatal. Initial signs of the disease may be limited to fever and lethargy, until significant internal organ damage results in labored breathing, squealing, bloody mucus, and eventual coma and death. Internally, the infection causes necrosis of the liver and damages other organs, especially the spleen, kidneys, and small intestine.

RHD, like myxomatosis, has been intentionally introduced to control feral rabbit populations in Australia and (illegally) in New Zealand, and RHD has, in some areas, escaped quarantine. The disease has killed tens of millions of rabbits in China (unintentionally) as well as Australia, with other epidemics reported in Bolivia, Mexico, South Korea, and continental Europe. Rabbit populations in New Zealand have bounced back after developing a genetic immunity to RHD, and the disease has, so far, had no effect on the genetically divergent native wild rabbits and hares in the Americas.

In the United States, an October 2013 USDA document stated:

In the UK, reports of RHD (as recently as February 2018) have been submitted to the British Rabbit Council's online "Notice Board". Vaccines for RHD are available—and mandatory—in the UK.

West Nile virus

West Nile virus is another threat to domestic as well as wild rabbits. It is a fatal disease, and while vaccines are available for other species, there are none yet specifically indicated for rabbits.

Wry neck and parasitic fungus

Wry neck (or head tilt) is a condition in rabbits that can be fatal, due to the resulting disorientation that causes the animal to stop eating and drinking. Inner ear infections or ear mites, as well as diseases or injuries affecting the brain (including stroke) can lead to wry neck. The most common cause, however, is a parasitic microscopic fungus called Encephalitozoon cuniculi (E. cuniculi). Note that: "despite approximately half of all pet rabbits carrying the infection, only a small proportion of these cases ever show any illness". Some vets now recommend treating rabbits against E. cuniculi. The usual drugs for treatment and prevention are the benzimidazole anthelmintics, particularly fenbendazole (also used as a deworming agent in other animal species). In the UK, fenbendazole (under the brand name Panacur Rabbit), is sold over-the-counter in oral paste form as a nine-day treatment. Fenbendazole is particularly recommended for rabbits kept in colonies and as a preventive before mixing new rabbits with each other.

Fly strike
Fly strike, or blowfly strike, (Lucilia sericata) is a condition that occurs when flies (particularly botflies) lay their eggs in a rabbit's damp or soiled fur, or in an open wound. Within 12 hours, the eggs hatch into the larval stage of the fly, known as maggots. The most susceptible rabbits are those in unsanitary conditions, sedentary ones, and those unable to clean their excretory areas. Rabbits with diarrhea should be inspected for fly strike, especially during the summer months. The topical treatment Rearguard® (from Novartis) is approved in the United Kingdom for 10-week-per-application prevention of fly strike.

Neoplasia 
The most common tumor type of rabbits is uterine adenomcarcinoma, followed by neoplasia in hematopoietic organs, skin, mammary gland, testes, and the digestive system. Subsequently, female intact rabbits have highest prevalence of neoplasia (19.7%) as compared to all sex combined (prevalence: 14.4%). Overall prevalence of neoplasia continuously increases with age and may affect up to 45% of rabbits older than 6 years. Histologic criteria of malignancy is present in most tumor specimens and distant spread to other organs is common for lymphoma and uterine adenocarcinoma. Lymphoma commonly occur in younger rabbits and frequently affect lymph nodes, gastrointestinal tract, kidneys, spleen, and liver.

Breeds

As of 2017, there were at least 305 breeds of domestic rabbit in 70 countries around the world. The American Rabbit Breeders Association currently recognizes 51 rabbit breeds and the British Rabbit Council recognizes 106. Selective breeding has produced rabbits ranging in size from dwarf to giant. Across the world, rabbits are raised as livestock (in cuniculture) for their meat, pelts, and wool, and also by fanciers and hobbyists as pets.

Rabbits have been selectively bred since ancient times to achieve certain desired characteristics. Variations include size and body shape, coat type (including hair length and texture), coat color, ear carriage (erect or lop), and even ear length. As with any animal, domesticated rabbits' temperaments vary in such factors as energy level and novelty seeking.

Most genetic defects in the domestic rabbit (such as dental problems in the Holland Lop breed) are due to recessive genes. Genetics are carefully tracked by fanciers who show rabbits, to breed out defects.

As pets

Rabbits have been kept as pets in Western nations since the 19th century, but because of the destructive history of feral rabbits in Australia, domestic rabbits are illegal as pets in Queensland. Depending upon its size, a rabbit may be considered a type of pocket pet. Rabbits can bond with humans, can learn to follow simple voice commands and to come when called, and are curious and playful.

Rabbits, like many other pets, do not make good pets for small children because rabbits are fragile and easily injured by rough handling, can bite when hurt or frightened, and are easily frightened by loud noises and sudden motions. With the right guidance, rabbits can be trained to live indoors perfectly.

Rabbits are especially popular as pets in the United States during the Easter season, due to their association with the holiday. However, animal shelters that accept rabbits often complain that during the weeks and months following Easter, there is a rise in unwanted and neglected rabbits that were bought as Easter gifts, especially for children.  Similar problems arise in rural areas after county fairs and the like, in jurisdictions where rabbits are legal prizes in fairground games.

Thus, there are many humane societies, animal shelters, and rescue groups that have rabbits available for pet adoption. Fancy rabbit breeds are often purchased from pet stores, private breeders, and fanciers.

House rabbits

Rabbits may be kept as small house pets and "rabbit-proofed" spaces reduce the risks associated with their intrinsic need to chew. Rabbits are easily litter box trained and a rabbit that lives indoors may be less exposed to the dangers of predators, parasites, diseases, adverse weather, and pesticides, which in turn increases their lifespan. Rabbits are often compatible with others of their kind, or with birds or guinea pigs, but opinion differs regarding the dangers of housing different species together. For example, while rabbits can synthesize their own vitamin C, guinea pigs cannot, so the two species should not be fed the same diet. Also, most rabbits tend to be stronger than guinea pigs, so this may cause deliberate or inadvertent injury. Some people consider rabbits a pocket pet even though they are rather large.

Keeping a rabbit as a house companion was popularised by Sandy Crook in her 1981 book Your French Lop. In 1983, at the American Family Pet Show in Anaheim, California (attended by 35,000), Crook presented her personal experiences living with an indoor rabbit as evidence of a human-rabbit bond. In the late 1980s, it became more common to litter box train a rabbit and keep it indoors, after the publication of Marinell Harriman's House Rabbit Handbook: How to Live with an Urban Rabbit in 1985.

As the domestic descendants of wild prey animals, rabbits are alert, timid creatures that startle fairly easily, and many of their behaviors are triggered by the fight-or-flight response to perceived threats. According to the House Rabbit Society, the owner of a pet rabbit can use various behavioral approaches to gain the animal's trust and reduce aggression, though this can be a long and difficult process.

In addition, there is evidence to suggest that young rabbits that occupy the periphery of the "litter huddle" obtain less milk from the mother and, as a result, have a lower weight. It has been suggested that this factor may contribute to behavioural differences in litter mates during adolescence.

Care 
Not all veterinarians will treat rabbits, and pet owners may have to seek out an exotic animal veterinarian for their rabbit's care. Rabbits need regular checkups at the veterinarian because they may hide signs of illness or disease. Additionally, rabbits need regular maintenance in the form of being able to chew on something and having their nails trimmed regularly.

Pet rabbits can often exhibit behaviour problems, including aggression towards humans and conspecifics, particularly with poor husbandry.  Rabbit owners can seek behaviour help through their vets and rabbit behaviourists.

Advantages and disadvantages 

Some advantages of keeping rabbits as pets is that they are clean, intelligent and soft. They may or may not react favorably to handling and petting depending on their personality and how they were raised. There are also many different sizes and characteristics available, owing to a long history of breeding. Rabbits are friendly to each other and are often compatible with other pets. Rabbits are herbivores and their diet is relatively simple. Compared to other small animals kept as pets, rabbits are physically robust creatures with strong hind legs that enable them to run fast, and they have powerful teeth. Rabbits should never be picked up by the ears or the "scruff" on the back of their neck, as their skeletons are light and fragile in comparison to their bodies, and are susceptible to trauma from falling, twisting and kicking. Rabbits breed rapidly and so it is often easy, and affordable, to find one to buy or adopt.

Some disadvantages of keeping rabbits as pets is that they may chew many things in the house. Unneutered male rabbits may spray their territory with a strong-smelling urine, unspayed female urine is also pungent, and so the litter box may smell. Rabbits can bite and scratch, and may do so to communicate displeasure, or if ignored; it is a part of normal communication and cannot be stopped entirely. They have to be picked up and handled properly to avoid injury to the rabbit or the owner. They may leave faeces around the house and are not always very conscious of leaving their droppings in the litter box. Rabbits can potentially be aggressive and territorial. Some rabbits may also be unfriendly, and then would be unsuitable as pets for children.

Rabbits have a different body language to the most common domestic pets: cats and dogs. If someone wants a rabbit and is only familiar with those pet animals, then they would have to learn a lot about caring for this species and the behaviour of rabbits. They are often compared to guinea pigs but they may be as similar, in care and behaviour, to guinea pigs as they are to cats. Like cats, they are smart and can be litterbox trained. They also use their teeth and claws as weapons of defense and they can jump like a cat. They are quiet like a cat and independent, but they are also quite curious.

As livestock

Rabbits have been kept as livestock since ancient times for their meat, wool, and fur. In modern times, rabbits are also utilized in scientific research as laboratory animals.

Meat rabbits

Breeds such as the New Zealand and Californian are frequently utilized for meat in commercial rabbitries.  These breeds have efficient metabolisms and grow quickly; they are ready for slaughter by approximately 14 to 16 weeks of age.

Rabbit fryers are rabbits that are between 70 and 90 days of age, and weighing between  live weight. Rabbit roasters are rabbits from 90 days to 6 months of age weighing between  live weight.

Any type of rabbit can be slaughtered for meat, but those exhibiting the "commercial" body type are most commonly raised for meat purposes. Dark fryers (any other color but albino whites) are sometimes lower in price than albino fryers because of the slightly darker tinge of the fryer (purely pink carcasses are preferred by consumers) and because the dark hairs are easier to see than if there are residual white hairs on the carcass. There is no difference in skinability.

Wool rabbits
Rabbits such as the Angora, American Fuzzy Lop, and Jersey Wooly produce wool. However, since the American Fuzzy Lop and Jersey Wooly are both dwarf breeds, only the much larger Angora breeds such as the English Angora, Satin Angora, Giant Angora, and French Angoras are used for commercial wool production. Their long fur is sheared, combed, or plucked (gently pulling loose hairs from the body during molting) and then spun into yarn used to make a variety of products. Angora sweaters can be purchased in many clothing stores and is generally mixed with other types of wool. Rabbit wool, called Angora, is 2.5 times warmer than sheep's wool.

Fur rabbits
Rabbit breeds that were developed for their fur qualities include the Rex with its plush texture, the Satin with its lustrous color, and the Chinchilla for its exotic pattern. White rabbit fur may be dyed in an array of colors that are not produced naturally. Rabbits in the fur industry are fed a diet focused for robust coat production and pelts are harvested after the rabbit reaches prime condition, which takes longer than in the meat industry. Rabbit fur is used in local and commercial textile industries throughout the world. China imports much of its rabbit fur from Scandinavia (80%) and some from North America (5%), according to the USDA Foreign Agricultural Service GAIN Report CH7607.

Laboratory rabbits
Rabbits have been and continue to be used in laboratory work such as production of antibodies for vaccines and research of human male reproductive system toxicology. In 1972, around 450,000 rabbits were used for experiments in the United States, decreasing to around 240,000 in 2006. The Environmental Health Perspective, published by the National Institute of Health, states, "The rabbit [is] an extremely valuable model for studying the effects of chemicals or other stimuli on the male reproductive system." According to the Humane Society of the United States, rabbits are also used extensively in the study of bronchial asthma, stroke prevention treatments, cystic fibrosis, diabetes, and cancer.

The New Zealand White is one of the most commonly used breeds for research and testing.

The use of rabbits for the Draize test, a method of testing cosmetics on animals, has been cited as an example of cruelty in animal research by animal rights activists. Albino rabbits are typically used in the Draize tests because they have less tear flow than other animals, and the lack of eye pigment makes the effects easier to visualize.

Housing

Rabbits can live outdoors in properly constructed, sheltered hutches, which provide protection from the elements in winter and keep rabbits cool in summer heat. To protect from predators, rabbit hutches are usually situated in a fenced yard, shed, barn, or other enclosed structure, which may also contain a larger pen for exercise. Rabbits in such an environment can alternatively be allowed to roam the secured area freely, and simply be provided with an adapted doghouse for shelter. A more elaborate setup is an artificial warren. However, because of stress related to being inside confined spaces too small for a rabbit, it is recommended that instead of a cage, domestic rabbits free-roam indoors.

Show jumping

Rabbit show jumping, a form of animal sport between rabbits, began in the 1970s and has since become popular in Europe, particularly Sweden and the United Kingdom. When rabbit jumping was first starting out, the rules of competition were the same as horse jumping rules. However, rules were later changed to reflect a rabbit's abilities. The first national championship for rabbit show jumping was held in Stockholm, Sweden in 1987. Any rabbit, regardless of breed, may participate in this kind of competition, as it is based on athletic skill.

Notes

See also

Cuniculture
Dwarf rabbit
Lop rabbit
Small pet
Domestication of animals
Domestic dog
Domestic cat
Domestic bird

References

External links 
 The Rabbit Welfare Association and Fund
 The American Rabbit Breeders Association – the oldest and largest rabbit specialist organization in the United States
 The Livestock Conservancy – a registry of the rarest breeds of domestic rabbits
 World Rabbit Science Association – an international science organization dedicated to rabbit health research
 The British Rabbit Council – recognized breeds with photographs and more
 MediRabbit – a site dedicated to spreading the knowledge of rabbit medicine and safe medication in rabbits, for the owner and the vet professional
 Rabbit Breeds - directory of ARBA-recognized breeds of rabbit
 Complete Guide of Rabbit Breeds - List of rabbit breeds approved by American Rabbit Breeders Association
 RabbitPedia.com - Source for information about rabbit care. 
 House Rabbit Society – a US-based educational and advocacy organization for rabbit pet-keepers, founded in 1988
 

Domesticated animals
Rabbits as pets
Livestock
Animal models